Monte Attell (July 28, 1885 – November 11, 1960), born in the Knob Hill neighborhood of San Francisco, California, United States, was an American boxer who took the vacant World Bantamweight title on June 19, 1909 by defeating the 1904 bantamweight title holder Frankie Neil.  He held the title until February 22, 1910.

In his career he faced world bantamweight champion Jimmy Reagan and the lesser known Danny Webster in title defenses, and after losing his title, Frankie Britt, and champions Johnny Kilbane, and Joe Lynch.

Early life and career
Attell was born on July 18, 1885 to a struggling Jewish family that, by one account, eventually had eighteen children.  As a poor Jewish kid of diminutive stature raised in a tough Irish neighborhood, Attell began his career as a fighter from a very early age. As his older brother Abe Attell (1884–1970) was the Featherweight Champion of the World during the same period, Monte and Abe became the first brothers to simultaneously hold world boxing titles.  Their brother, Caesar, also fought and was called "Two and a Half," for always giving that amount whenever the hat was passed for charity at boxing events.  Like his brother Abe, Monte spent some of his youth and likely some of his later life selling newspapers for a living. At the age of 14, Attell was treated for burns to the face and hands from a childhood accident with a toy cannon which may have contributed to his decline as a boxer as he aged.

From fighting for survival in the streets, Monte Attell turned professional by 1902, winning his first five bouts. He lost several of his early bouts, but between February 1906 and May 1909, he won ten continuous matches. His performance earned him a chance to fight for the vacant Bantamweight championship in 1909.

Before his world bantamweight championship bout, Attell defeated Dusty Miller on November 5, 1904 in a six-round points decision at the Chicago Athletic Club.  Two weeks later, Attell defeated Miller again at the West End Athletic Club in St. Louis, in a ten-round points decision.  In their bout in St. Louis, Attell had the lead throughout, boring in constantly, and defending with skill.  Miller fought back gamely, but Attell clearly held the better hand.  In the fifth to the ninth rounds, Miller stalled, and though he rallied in the tenth, the round finished even.  Attell received the decision for his ability to penetrate Miller's defenses with stronger, if at times less frequent blows.

Attell knocked out Johnny Reagan on December 22, 1904 in seventeen rounds in St. Louis.  Though the first nine rounds were close, and Reagan knocked down Attell in the sixth, from the thirteenth through the seventeenth, Attell took the advantage.  In the seventeenth, a left and right to the jaw, preceded by a single blow to the chin sent Reagan to the canvas for the full count.  In two previous meetings at St. Louis's West End Club, Attell had won in a close fifteen round points decision in St. Louis on December 15, 1904, and in an eighth round points decision the previous month.

Loss to flyweight champ Owen Moran, 1905

Attell lost to accomplished British boxer Owen Moran on May 15, 1905 in a twenty-round points decision at the Pallisades in New York before a private, affluent crowd of around 150, who paid as much as $10 to see the fight, a princely sum in that era.  Moran held the BBBC Flyweight Championship of Great Britain in 1903 and would compete several times for the bantamweight championship of his native land.  Moran fought with more telling blows which won him the decision.  By the sixth, both fighters were fatigued, and in the seventh, Moran hooked a strong left to the jaw of Attell staggering him, and causing him to fall against the ropes as the round ended.  Moran tried to finish Attell through the final ten rounds, but was unable, as his opponent would retreat or clinch to save himself. The bout caused a serious eye injury to Attell which became permanent and eventually led to blindness.

On March 29, 1905, Attell fought Jimmy Walsh in Philadelphia in what many sources considered a World Bantamweight Title match that ended when the referee called a disqualification against Walsh in the sixth round for a low blow.  One source noted that Walsh, "had the better of the bout from the start", and that the blow which occurred two minutes into the sixth round was accidental.  Attell claimed to have been injured, and a foul was called by the referee, but Walsh was recognized as the Bantamweight Champion, by the National Boxing Association.

In an early loss against a known competitor, Attell lost to Freddie Weeks on September 3, 1906 in a fifth-round knockout at the Grand Opera House at Victor, Colorado.  Weeks was a quick and scrappy competitor who fought some of the best, including Monte's brother Abe in October 1907 and January 1909 in unsuccessful title matches for the world featherweight championship. 

Attell defeated Mike Kutchos on November 25, 1908 for the Pacific Coast Bantamweight Title, winning in a fifteen-round points decision.  

Attell drew with Jimmy Walsh at the Colliseum in San Francisco in a fifteen-round points decision on December 21, 1908.  Walsh claimed to hold the world bantamweight title at the time, and the bout was billed as a world bantamweight title match for the limit of 116 pounds, but no title officially changed hands, as Walsh was overweight.  As was typically the case with Attell, he was superior in the infighting, but Walsh lead and was more aggressive in the bout, and he may have landed the more telling blows, accounting for the draw decision.  In the fifteenth, Walsh battered Attell badly making up any lead Attell enjoyed, and Attell's face appeared far more battered at the end of the bout.

World bantamweight champion, 1909

On June 19, 1909, Monte Attell won the World Bantamweight title defeating former champion Frankie Neil at Coffroth's Arena, in an eighteenth-round knockout in Colma, California.  The bout was billed as a championship for the world bantamweight title.  According to W. W. Naughton writing for the Oakland Tribune, Attell won every round of the eighteen round bout, which was ended by a full left handed blow to the chin of Frankie Neil. Neil reportedly "took a terrible mauling without flinching.  From the very first it was apparent that the only chance Neil had was to outgame Attell and wear him down by persistent rushing for he was being outpunched at least two to one and the blows of the Hebrew fighter (Attell) were not the easiest either."   Though Neil was the aggressor through much of the bout, Attell "peppered Neil with straight lefts", brought crushing rights to the jaw, and delivered solid rights to the midsection that eventually took their toll on his opponent. In the fifteenth, Neil was down from a left to the stomach, and twice he stumbled to his hands and knees in the clinches.  He was nearly finished at the end of the round from lefts and rights but was saved by the fifteenth's closing bell.  Though Attell could not finish Neal in the next two rounds, but in the eighteenth, as Neil first approached, Attell finished him with a straight left to the jaw that put him down for the count.  Neil had last held the title in 1904, before losing it to British bantamweight Joe Bowker.

In the seven months following his winning the title on June 19, 1909, Attell successfully defended it seven times.

Title matches with Jimmy Reagan, 1909

He fought Jimmy Reagan on February 22, 1909, in a World Bantamweight Title match that resulted in a twenty-round points decision at the Mission Street Arena in San Francisco, California. In this exciting match, Attell was down four times in the early rounds, though he came back quickly.  The Oakland Tribune had Attell winning every round after the seventh. On August 11, 1909, he successfully and more decisively defended his title once again against Jimmy Reagan in a fourth-round knockout in Oakland, California.  Attell stood toe to toe with Reagan and "outfoxed, outboxed, and outgeneralled him".  Attell was noted to have fought excellently in close, while maintaining an excellent defense, ducking, dodging, and blocking with great effect. He had fought Reagan earlier in a non-title match in Oakland, California, on November 30, 1908, that resulted in a fifteen-round points decision.

World bantam title defenses

Percy Cove
On August 20, 1909, Attell defeated Percy Cove in a title bout and retained the world bantamweight championship in a tenth-round technical knockout before a packed house at the Mission Athletic Club in San Francisco.  A left drive to the jaw in the tenth round put Cove against the ropes and nearly helpless in the tenth, though he had fought valiantly in the early rounds.  By the third round, Attell was connecting hooks to the stomach of Cove and getting under his attempts to block, though Cove's considerable advantage in reach and height served him well in the first two rounds. In the remaining rounds, Attell used blows to the stomach, followed by lefts to the face to even the match and take a lead in points.  Cove's left knocked down Attell once in the second, but Attell's advantage in the remaining rounds took the starch out of Cove's blows.

Daniel Webster
Attell drew with Daniel Webster on October 12, 1909, in another bantamweight title match. In this no decision bout, a win required agreement by two of three newspapers as to who had won the match, and since two Los Angeles newspapers called the fight even, it was officially declared a draw.  Attell drew with Webster twice more in bantamweight title matches, once in a ten-round match in Los Angeles in November, 1909 and once in a twenty-round match in San Francisco in December of that year.

Phil McGovern
In a bout billed as a world bantamweight title match on January 30, 1911, Attell won a ten-round newspaper decision to retain his title against Phil McGovern, brother to champion Terry, at the Athletic Club in Brooklyn.  In a close and brutal bout, McGovern sent Attell to the floor three times in the first round. The New York Tribune wrote that Attell traded punches with McGovern at three to one, and used his advantage in height and reach as well as a hard, straight punch that crossed inside to win their newspaper decision.  Attell was down in the second as well from a swing to the jaw, though he rose quickly after his trip to the mat.  McGovern sensed a quick victory, but Attell stood him off with straight lefts.  McGovern's aggressiveness made the bout look like a contest, and his ability to take his time with his opponent and effectively use lefts to the face, won him the decision of the New York Tribune.  Newspapers were divided on who had won the bout, but the local papers, The New York Times, and Brooklyn Daily Eagle favored Attell as the winner. The Brooklyn Daily Eagle wrote that Attell used stabbing lefts to counter McGovern's advances in the fourth and fifth.  After the fifth, Attell's left to the face and right cross to the jaw dominated the bout, and took the steam from McGovern.  In the ninth and tenth, McGovern staged an ineffective rally, and was stopped by Attell's counterpunches.

Johnny Daly
Attell defeated Johnny Daly in a world bantamweight title match on October 2, 1911 in a close ten round points decision in New Orleans, Louisiana.  The decision was not popular with the crowd, and the police stepped into the ring to protect the boxers.  Attell, having a longer reach, used his left to shove back Daly's face to gain an opening, and then connected with his right to the chin or chest on multiple occasions. Daly's strong left failed often to reach its target against the rapid maneuvers of Attell, who showed better defensive ringcraft. By the tenth round, Attell's right eye was a frequent object of Daly's who connected with two lefts.

Bouts with Jimmy Carroll
Attell defeated Jimmy Carroll in a ten-round newspaper decision on October 26, 1909 at Piedmont Pavilion in Oakland.  The Los Angeles Times wrote that "from the tap of the bell in the first round, he (Attell) took the aggressive and never once allowed Carroll the upper hand."  Attell, who had been training and taking fights in the months preceding the contest, unlike Carroll, showed greater endurance and by the fifth this showed most strongly as he began to throw the most telling punches against Carroll.  Carroll was down for a count of seven in the fifth.  In the tenth round, Carroll tried to score enough points to gain a draw decision, but Attell was too far ahead on points and won the decision of most newspapers.  Attell came in close with both hands, fighting a successful bout from the first to the final rounds.  In their first meeting on January 12, 1904, Attell knocked out Carroll, only 1:59 seconds into the first round at Colma, California.   In a subsequent meeting with Carroll on February 15, 1907, he fought a four-round draw in a points decision in San Francisco.  Only two months later, on April 5, 1907, he lost to Carroll in a four-round points decision at Dreamland Pavilion in San Francisco.  

A year later on March 14, 1908, in one of their more well publicized bouts, Attell drew with Carroll in a fifteen-round points decision at Coffroth's Arena in San Francisco.  Carroll, who was outweighed by Attell, fought on the aggressive and evened the points scoring as Attell fought more defensively in the later rounds of the bout.  Carroll, who was much slimmer than Attell, scored repeatedly with straight lefts, but did more poorly in the infighting, where Attell excelled.  In the only knockdown of the fight, Attell sent Carroll to the canvas with a hard right to the chin, but was unable to score knockdowns in the subsequent rounds, where Carroll defended well, except in the infighting, making a draw decision a reasonable choice.

Loss of  Bantam title, 1910

Attell lost the world bantamweight championship to Frankie Conley on February 22, 1910, at the Pacific Athletic Club in Vernon, a suburb of Los Angeles, by a knockout in the 42nd round.

Conley's knockout win was something of a surprise to the audience, as he was only 20, and Attell was a well established champion. Conley staggered Attell with a right to the jaw in the thirteenth, but the first twenty rounds seemed rather even. By the 33rd round Attell seemed physically diminished from a blow to the chest from Conley.  Astonishingly, neither men were down in the grueling bout until Attell took his final dive in the 42nd round.  Attell's left eye was closed, and he appeared to have taken worse injuries than his opponent.  The grueling three hour spectacle ended when Conley knocked out Attell with a strong right.  Some sources may give an earlier date as to when Attell first relinquished the World Bantamweight Title.

Attell fought a six-round draw with Jewish boxer Louisiana, on February 11, 1911 in Old City Hall in Pittsburgh.  Joe Biderberg, known as Louisiana, was put to the canvas by Attell two minutes into the first round, but the battle resumed at as fast  a pace as it had begun. Louisiana held frequently in clinches, likely tired and wary of the blows of Attell.  Louisiana had the better of the outside boxing, showing great defense and ducking, but Attell excelled at the infighting, as was typical of his style.  Louisiana showed better speed and was more illusive but Attell's superior infighting, though brutal at times, made the decision of most newspapers a draw.

Attell defeated Patsy Brannigan on December 14, 1911, in a close six-round newspaper decision at Duquesne Gardens in Pittsburgh.  Typical of Attell's style, he had the best of the infighting.  He was reviewed by the Pittsburgh Post as having cleaner, more telling blows, and though he allowed Brannigan to do most of the leading in the bout, he countered effectively and the blows he landed were harder than his opponents.  The Post also noted that, as was typical of his style of fighting, he "worked best in the clinches", and excelled in the infighting, and since it was the local paper, was used for the decision.  Other newspapers noted that Brannigan's aggressive display in the fifth and sixth rounds should have turned the decision in his favor.

Boxing decline, eye injury
Attell first fought Johnny Kilbane, future world featherweight champion from 1912-23, on March 24, 1911, drawing in ten rounds in Cleveland, Ohio.  One reporter noted that Kilbane injured his right hand in the first round and could only push it into Attell's face when he half clinched, though he did damage with his strong right throughout the bout.  Kilbane landed a storm of punches in the second round.  Attell fought very aggressively and got in left slams to the body as well as stiff counterpunches to Kilbane's face. On December 3, 1912, losing to Kilbane in a ninth-round technical knockout in Cleveland, Ohio,  Attell was down more than six times before the police ordered the bout stopped to prevent a knockout.  Kilbane became the aggressor in the second round and for much of the remainder of the bout, Attell had to cover up to save himself from Kibane's fierce attack.

In a well publicized match, Attell lost to Al Delmont on April 12, 1911 in a twelve-round points decision in Boston.  In the first two rounds, Delmont gained a considerable lead with lefts and rights to the face, but in the next seven rounds, Delmont clinched often, while Attell shot his left to the face and body and his right to the ribs. Delmont occasionally got his right to Attell's face and landed right counters.  With jabs and right crosses to the face and jaw, Delmont, showing his old form, earned a sufficient points margin in the eleventh and twelfth, to gain the popular decision. 

In a close bout, Attell again lost to Delmont in a twelve-round points decision on April 18, 1911 in the Arena in Boston. In a very close and hard-fought bout, Delmont did considerable jabbing, and Attell went to the body often with both hands.  The eleventh round saw Delmont taking the lead, and in the twelfth his more aggressive fighting won him the very close decision.

Sometime in 1914, Attell incurred an eye injury that became infected, and eventually resulted in a loss of sight in the eye. 

Future world bantamweight champion, Joe Lynch (boxer) knocked out Attell in the seventh round of a scheduled ten round bout at the Pioneer Sporting Club on September 5, 1916 in East Liverpool, Ohio.  Lynch would hold the world bantamweight championship in the early 1920s. Attell was down in the first round.

Attell lost to Young Zulu Kid on June 24, 1916 in a ten-round newspaper decision of the New York Evening Telegram at the Fairmont Athletic Club in the Bronx.  Despite a significant reach advantage over the diminutive Italian boxer, Attell lost the bout to the Kid who fought several quality competitors but lacked a winning record against them.  The Kid had contended for the world flyweight title unsuccessfully on December 16, 1916, and would later contend for the American flyweight title.  

Attell fought top rated boxer Frankie Britt near the end of his career on September 15, 1916, losing in a third-round knockout in Boston. The final blow was a short right to the jaw, delivered by Britt.  Attell was reported in less than peak condition.    Tellingly, though not unusual for an aging boxer in the era, particularly one with vision problems, Attell lost nineteen of twenty-four bouts between February 7, 1912, and October 30, 1916, near the end of his boxing career.

Retirement, and death
Attell initially retired from boxing in 1916, largely as the result of an eye infection that eventually led to his going blind in the eye.  He had lost most of his vision in the other eye as a result of injuries sustained during his fight with Owen Moran in May 1905.  One of his last bouts was a seven-round knockout loss on October 16, 1930, to Marty Taylor, known as Kid Taylor, a featherweight who had fought but not beaten several quality boxers.  In his youth, he had knocked out Taylor on April 21, 1905 in New York.

In a final return to boxing on January 19, 1917, Attell lost to Manchester boxer Joe Morgan in Boston.  Attell received a terrific lacing in the fifth, and appeared to be behind on points in every round, before he was put down for the count in the sixth by his opponent.  Although he had fought some quality opposition, Attell did not win a single fight in 1916.

In time, a failed business and the Great Depression of the late 1920s and early 1930s wiped out his savings.  By February 1923, according to one source, Attell was short on funds, blind, and residing at the Alameda County Hospital.  While blind, he was forced at one point to sell peanuts and cigarettes at fights to raise money, while a young man led him to his customers.  Hearing of his plight, Jack Dempsey later financed a cigar stand in San Francisco that supplied Attell a decent living for many years.   He was married to wife Mary, formerly Mary Forman, but had no children of their own.  In 1957, he suffered a heart attack and retired to Palo Alto for a period. After his passing in 1960 at his home on South Court in Palo Alto, he was interred in Cypress Lawn Memorial Park in the San Francisco suburb, Colma, California, the city in which he had first taken his World Bantamweight title.

Professional boxing record
All information in this section is derived from BoxRec, unless otherwise stated.

Official record

All newspaper decisions are officially regarded as “no decision” bouts and are not counted in the win/loss/draw column.

Unofficial record

Record with the inclusion of newspaper decisions in the win/loss/draw column.

Primary boxing achievements
Attell was elected to the International Jewish Sports Hall of Fame in 2015.

|-

|-

See also
List of bantamweight boxing champions
List of select Jewish boxers

References

External links
 
 Jews in Sports entry

Monte Attell - CBZ Profile

1885 births
1960 deaths
Jewish boxers
Jewish American boxers
Bantamweight boxers
Boxers from San Francisco
World bantamweight boxing champions
World boxing champions
American male boxers
Burials at Cypress Lawn Memorial Park